COAG may refer to:
Chronic open angle glaucoma
Coordinadora de Organizaciones de Agricultores y Ganaderos
Council of Australian Governments